Cowslip may refer to:

Plants
 Primula veris, an Old World flowering plant commonly known as cowslip, common cowslip, or cowslip primrose (syn. Primula officinalis),
 Primula deorum, also known as Rila primrose, Rila cowslip or God's cowslip, alpine flower native to Bulgaria
 Primula florindae, a flowering plant known as giant cowslip and Tibetan cowslip, native to southeastern Tibet
 Primula sikkimensis, a flowering plant known as Himalayan cowslip and Sikkim cowslip 
 Caltha palustris, a northern hemisphere flowering plant known as marsh marigold, kingcup and in America sometimes as cowslip
 Pulmonaria angustifolia, blue cowslip or narrow-leaved lungwort of central/northern Europe

Naval ships
 USCGC Cowslip (WLB-277), a sea going buoy tender
 USS Cowslip (1863), a United States Navy steamship
 HMS Cowslip, a Flower-class corvette commissioned 9 August 1941 and scrapped in 1949

Other uses
 Cowslip (racehorse), a competitor in the 1836 Grand National
 Cowslip (Watership Down), a rabbit in the novel Watership Down
 Cowslip (bovine podiatry), a tough plastic shoe used to treat lameness in cattle